Oleksiy Povchiy (17 March 1754 – 11 July 1831) was a Ruthenian Greek Catholic hierarch. He was bishop of the Ruthenian Catholic Eparchy of Mukacheve from 1817 to 1831.

Born in Kokad, Kingdom of Hungary (present day – Hungary) in 1754, he was ordained a priest on 1789. He was confirmed as the Bishop by the Holy See on 28 July 1817. He was consecrated to the Episcopate on 6 November 1817. The principal consecrator was Bishop Samuil Vulcan.

He died in Uzhhorod on 11 July 1831.

References 

1754 births
1831 deaths
19th-century Eastern Catholic bishops
Ruthenian Catholic bishops